Hizom Darreh
Hizom Darreh(), is a village in Lavasan-e Bozorg Rural District, Lavasanat District, Shemiranat County, Tehran Province, Iran. At the 2020 census, its population was 152, in 37 families. A valley located in the west of Vasifjan village and at the bottom of Sengkoh peak.
This valley extends in the northeast to southwest direction and its slope is towards the village of Juzak. Hizmdare leads from the north and northeast to the lower part of Sengno peak, and from the south and southwest to the village of Jozak.
The length of the valley path is about 1,200 meters, and the height difference between its two starting and ending points is about 200 meters. Hizmdare is a small valley, and it lacks permanent water and river. With the expansion of urbanization and road construction, part of this valley has been destroyed. There is not much hiking in this valley and mostly the people of the region use it. The water resulting from the melting of the snows of Sengkoh peak and other peaks of the region reaches Jozak village through this valley.

References 

Populated places in Shemiranat County